Agylla sericea is a moth of the family Erebidae. It was described by Herbert Druce in 1885. It is found in Mexico, Guatemala, Puerto Rico, Colombia, Brazil, Bolivia and Peru.

References

Moths described in 1885
sericea
Moths of North America
Moths of South America